Custonaci (Sicilian: Custunaci) is a town and comune in the  province of Trapani, south-Western Sicily, southern Italy-

Economy 
The coast around Mount Cofano attracts tourists to the   seaside village of Cornino.

References 

Municipalities of the Province of Trapani